Cationic amino acid transporter 3 is a protein that in humans is encoded by the SLC7A3 gene.

SLC7A3 is a member of the system y+ family of transporters characterized by sodium-independent transport of cationic amino acids.[supplied by OMIM]

See also
 Solute carrier family

References

Further reading

Solute carrier family